Dennis Murphy is an enthusiast who has been on the field of two wheels competitions since he was only 15 years old in 1989.

Early life 
Dennis Murphy a 1974 born motor sport cyclist and off-road car navigator, started the love for off-road at 15 years back in 1989, since then he has been active throughout.

Racing career
He raced in a number of Dakar rallies as navigator, in 2017 driving with Giniel de Villiers. With de Villiers he won the 2017 Kalahari Botswana 1000 Desert Race.

He was named Donaldson Champion Cross Country Co-Driver in 2013. and 2014

References 

South African rally drivers
Off-road racing drivers
1974 births
Living people
Dakar Rally winning drivers

Dakar Rally co-drivers